The Albatrellaceae are a family of fungi in the order Russulales. The family contains 9 genera and more than 45 species.

Description

Most genera in the family produce fruit bodies which have typical mushroom morphology, with caps and stems. Others form false truffles. It also includes a single corticioid genus; Byssoporia.

See also
 List of Basidiomycota families

References

External links

  The Families of Mushrooms and Toadstools Represented in the British Isles Family description

Russulales
Basidiomycota families